The 23rd edition of the Vuelta Ciclista de Chile was held from March 23 to April 2, 2000. The stage began with a four-kilometer prologue time trial in the heart of Santiago.

Stages

2000-03-23: Vitacura — Vitacura (4 km)

2000-03-24: Santiago — Los Andes (109.9 km)

2000-03-25: Los Andes — Viña del Mar (133.6 km)

2000-03-26: Viña del Mar — El Tabo (141.6 km)

2000-03-27: San Antonio — Los Maitenes (194.4 km)

2000-03-28: San Fernando — Talca (164.9 km)

2000-03-29: Cauquenes — Penco (140.5 km)

2000-03-30: San Fernando — Talca (110 km)

2000-03-30: Chillán — Chillán (20 km)

2000-03-31: Quirihue — Curicó (213.2 km)

2000-04-01: Curicó — Santiago (190.9 km)

2000-04-02: Santiago (Circuito "Providencia") (69.9 km)

Final classification

References 
 cyclingnews

Vuelta Ciclista de Chile
Chile
Vuelta Ciclista
March 2000 sports events in South America
April 2000 sports events in South America